Duncan John Reay Watson (4 November 1867 – 30 October 1948) was a solicitor and member of the Queensland Legislative Assembly.

Biography
Watson was born at Timaru, New Zealand, to parents John Dalton Watson and his wife Mary Annie (née Mackay) and educated in Queensland at Maryborough State School and Maryborough Grammar School. He commenced work as an apprentice builder with his father and then became a teacher at Maryborough Central State School. He next worked for the Bank of NSW in northern and central Queensland.

He was admitted to the Queensland Bar as a solicitor in 1895 and operated his own successful legal practice until his retirement in 1938.

In 1905 Watson married Elizabeth Margaret Crowe in Sydney and together had one daughter. He died at Indooroopilly in Brisbane in 1948. His funeral proceeded from the Holy Family Catholic Church, Indooroopilly, to the Toowong Cemetery.

Political career
After the death of serving member, Francis Kates, in 1903, Watson won the resulting by-election for the seat of Cunningham in the Queensland Legislative Assembly. He held the seat for less than a year, being beaten at the 1904 state election by the Ministerial candidate, Francis Grayson.

He stood at the 1920 state election as an independent Country Party candidate for the seat of Stanley but was well beaten by both other candidates. He later joined the Australian Labor Party, and unsuccessfully contested the federal seat of Maranoa at the 1934 federal election.

References

Members of the Queensland Legislative Assembly
1867 births
1948 deaths
People from Timaru